The Women's 3x50 metre medley relay CP C was one of the events held in swimming at the 1980 Summer Paralympics in Arnhem.

Only one team, representing the United States, entered the race. In order to win gold, therefore, the team simply needed to complete the race. The Americans were disqualified, however; thus, no team completed the event, and no medals were awarded.

References 

Women's 3x50 metre medley relay CP C